The Micromax Ninja A89 is a dual SIM Android smartphone launched & marketed by Micromax Mobile. It was launched in February 2013 in India. The phone is now discontinued.

This phone offers only 512 MB internal memory but it can be increased to greater extent by using various memory partition tools like RAMEXPANDER app.

Features 
Processor:      1 GHz Mediatek MT6577(Dual core)
OS:             Android 4.0.4 ICS
Dimensions:     124×64×10.6mm
Display:        10.1 cm, TFT 262K Color 480 x 800 pixels, 3.97 inches (~235 ppi pixel density)
Multi Touch:    2 Point
Band Mode:      GSM 900/1800 MHz WCDMA 2100 MHz
HSDPA:          7.1 Mbit/s
HSUPA:          5.76 Mbit/s
Camera:         3 MP FF Camera 640*480Rec,1280*720 playback, No Flash
Memory:         ROM 4GB, Internal Memory 2.07GB, Expandable Memory 32GB Micro SD, RAM 512MB
GPS:            Yes with A-GPS support
Connectivity:   Bluetooth 2.1, USB 2.0, 3G, Wi-Fi, Bluetooth tethering is supported. Wi-Fi Hotspot is supported.
Sensors:        Gravity, Proximity
Battery:        1450mAh
Talktime:       4 Hours claimed
Standby Time:   170 Hours claimed
Multimedia:     3GP, MP4, MP3, WAV, MIDI, Video Frame Rate 30fps, FM Radio
Color:          Black
Connectors:     Micro USB, Ear Jack 3.5 mm
Applications:   Hook up, M! live, M! store, M! Zone+, Fruit Devil, Darkman

See also
 Micromax Canvas 2 A110
 List of Android devices

References

External links 
 

Micromax Mobile
Android (operating system) devices
Smartphones
Discontinued smartphones